Electric Literature is an independent publisher founded by Andy Hunter and Scott Lindenbaum in 2009 as a quarterly journal. It launched the first fiction magazine on the iPhone and iPad. The print version of the journal is produced via print on demand.

In May 2012, Electric Literature launched Recommended Reading, a Tumblr-based magazine. Each issue is curated by a prominent editor or writer, offering one free piece of fiction every week.

Notes

External links
 Official website
 "A Literary Journal on Every Platform: Electric Literature", FSG.

Small press publishing companies
Publishing companies established in 2009